Pfaltz, an obsolete spelling of Pfalz, may refer to:

 Ober Pfaltz or Upper Palatinate, a district in Bavaria, Germany

People with the surname
 Andreas Pfaltz (born 1948), Swiss chemist
 Hugo Pfaltz (1932–2019), American politician

See also 
 Falz (disambiguation)
 Pfalz (disambiguation)

German words and phrases
German-language surnames